The 2002 Regal Welsh Open was a professional ranking snooker tournament that took place between 23 and 27 January 2002 at the Cardiff International Arena in Cardiff, Wales.

Paul Hunter defeated Ken Doherty 9–7 in the final to win his second ranking title. The final was a repeat of the previous year's tournament in which Ken Doherty defeated Paul Hunter 9–2.

Tournament summary 

Defending champion Ken Doherty was the number 1 seed with World Champion Ronnie O'Sullivan seeded 2. The remaining places were allocated to players based on the world rankings.

Main draw

Final

References

2002
Welsh Open
Open (snooker)
Welsh Open, 2002